Elkhorn Creek is a stream in Nodaway County in the U.S. state of Missouri. It is a tributary of the Nodaway River.

According to tradition, Elkhorn Creek was so named on account of elk in the area.

See also
List of rivers of Missouri

References

Rivers of Nodaway County, Missouri
Rivers of Missouri